Fernvale is a town located in north-eastern New South Wales, Australia, in the Tweed Shire.

Demographics 

The median age of the Fernvale population was 42 years, 5 years above the national median of 37.

81.2% of people living in Fernvale were born in Australia. The other top responses for country of birth were England 6.3%, India 1.3%, Germany 1.3%, Belgium 1.3%, Japan 1.3%.

87.8% of people spoke only English at home; the next most common languages were 1.7% Japanese, 1.3% Russian, 1.3% French, 1.3% Maltese, 1.3% Thai.

References 

Suburbs of Tweed Heads, New South Wales